Marksheet is an Indian Assamese-language film directed by Ratan Sil Sarma. It stars Pranami Bora, Jintu kalita and Aditya Malla. The film was released theatrically on 6 April 2016.

Cast 

 Pranami Bora
 Jintu Kalita
 Aditya Malla

Awards and nominations

References 

2010s Assamese-language films